Otaqvar Rural District is a rural district (dehestan) in Otaqvar District, Langarud County, Gilan Province, Iran. At the 2006 census, its population was 8,487, in 2,314 families. The rural district has 88 villages.

References 

Rural Districts of Gilan Province
Langarud County